= Priyanka Menon =

Indian novelist and writer of fiction

Priyanka S. Menon
- Occupations: Writer; teacher
- Writing career
- Language: English
- Years active: 2015–present
- Genres: Romance; young-adult fiction
- Notable works: The One That Got Away; Bowled Over; Served With Love

Priyanka S. Menon is an Indian novelist and writer of fiction. She is a lecturer and a spoken word poet. She won the Harlequin India passion contest in 2015 and has released her first book, The One That Got Away, the same year. She has published books with Harlequin India and Juggernaut.in. When she is not penning love stories or writing poetry, Menon teaches advertising to college students.

== Works ==
The majority of Menon's works are in the romance genre.

The One That Got Away (2015) is the story of estranged best friends who try to find their way back to each other. The two schooltime best friends, who parted on bad terms, did not expect to still have a soft spot for each other. Years later, they meet again at a friend's wedding.

Bowled Over is the story of an Australian cricket captain falling in love with a Mumbai girl. It is a simple story of love, friendship, life, and relationship.

Served With Love (2017) is the tale of two chefs finding each other through love, food, and travel. The story revolves around Abhimanyu (a rich and successful businessman as well as the chief chef) and Pakhi (an able sous chef) whom Abhi hires in his hotel.
